İdris Nebi Taşkan (born 18 August 1997) is a Turkish actor and basketball player.

Filmography

References

External links
 

Turkish male television actors
Turkish men's basketball players
1997 births
Living people